The BrahMos Aerospace is an Indo-Russian multinational aerospace and defense corporation, with core manufacturing concentrations in Cruise missiles. Headquartered in New Delhi, India, it was founded as a joint venture between the India's Defence Research and Development Organisation and NPO Mashinostroyenia of Russia. Company's name is a portmanteau formed from the names of two rivers, the Brahmaputra of India and the Moskva of Russia.

The company currently manufactures BrahMos missile with a range of 300 km and traveling at speeds of Mach 4. It is currently developing BrahMos-II, a hypersonic cruise missile.

India is a member of the MTCR, India and Russia are now planning to jointly develop a new generation of Brahmos missiles with 600 km-plus range and an ability to hit protected targets with pinpoint accuracy.

History

After the Gulf War of the 1990s, there was a feeling that it was necessary to have a cruise missile system in India. As a result, in 1998, then Scientific Advisor of India to Defense Minister A. P. J. Abdul Kalam and Deputy Defence Minister of Russia N.V. Mikhailov signed an inter-governmental agreement in Moscow.

India holds a 50.5% share stake in the company and Russia holds the other 49.5%.

Expansion
BrahMos Aerospace production centre first started at Hyderabad in Andhra Pradesh. In 2007, BrahMos Aerospace acquired Kerala Hitech Industries Limited at Thiruvananthapuram in Kerala and converted it into BrahMos Aerospace Trivandrum Limited which made it into the second missile making unit for a world-class missile facility with system integration and testing.

BrahMos Aerospace is going to setup 200 acres factory for the production of BrahMos NG in Uttar Pradesh's Lucknow. This third unit that will be involved in the production of BrahMos missile.

Defence Research and Development Organisation is planning to set up a third production centre in Nagpur in Maharashtra.

Aim and objective
The fulfill the aim which was to design, develop, manufacture and market the world's fastest supersonic cruise missile system.

Organisation and leadership

References

External links

Official
 
 Official Website of the BrahMos Aerospace Thiruvananthapuram Limited
 BrahMos - A project of two Governments
 BrahMos - A Missile with a Niche

Others
 India and Russia will decide on export of BrahMos
 BATL set to make BrahMos engines
 Prime Minister Manmohan Singh commends BrahMos team
 BrahMos Aerospace plans expansion
 New missile race: America and Russia are joined by India and China

Defence Research and Development Organisation
Defence companies of India
Indian companies established in 1998
India–Russia relations
Tactical Missiles Corporation
1998 establishments in Delhi